A conjugated protein is a protein that functions in interaction with other (non-polypeptide) chemical groups attached by covalent bonding or weak interactions.

Many proteins contain only amino acids and no other chemical groups, and they are called simple proteins. However, other kind of proteins yield, on hydrolysis, some other chemical component in addition to amino acids and they are called conjugated proteins. The non-amino part of a conjugated protein is usually called its prosthetic group. Most prosthetic groups are formed from vitamins. Conjugated proteins are classified on the basis of the chemical nature of their prosthetic groups.

Examples

Some examples of conjugated proteins are lipoproteins, glycoproteins, Nucleoproteins, phosphoproteins, hemoproteins, flavoproteins, metalloproteins, phytochromes, cytochromes, opsins, and chromoproteins.

Hemoglobin contains the prosthetic group known as heme. Each heme group contains an iron ion (Fe2+) which forms a co-ordinate bond with an oxygen molecule (O2), allowing hemoglobin to transport oxygen through the bloodstream. As each of the four protein subunits of hemoglobin possesses its own prosthetic heme  group, each hemoglobin can transport four molecules of oxygen. 

Glycoproteins are generally the largest and most abundant group of conjugated proteins. They range from glycoproteins in cell surface membranes that constitute the glycocalyx, to important antibodies produced by leukocytes. 

Chemical synthesized polysaccharide–protein conjugates been used for food industry, vaccines, and drug delivery systems. They are promising alternatives to PEG–protein drugs, in which non-biodegradable high molecular weight PEG causes health concerns.

References

Protein structure